The 2019 AFF U-22 Youth Championship or AFF U-22 LG Cup 2019 was the 2nd edition of the AFF U-22 Youth Championship organised by the ASEAN Football Federation (AFF). Indonesia won the tournament after defeating Thailand 2–1 in the final. The tournament was held from 17 to 26 February in Phnom Penh, Cambodia. This was its first as an under-22 tournament, with the previous edition being an under-23 tournament. 2005 AFF U-23 Youth Championship winners Thailand were the defending champions, as there was no competition from 2006 to 2018 and the 2011 edition was cancelled.

Qualified teams 
There was no qualification. All entrants advanced to the final tournament. The following teams from member associations of the AFF entered the tournament (excluding Australia). Singapore withdrew from the tournament in order to focus on the 2020 AFC U-23 Championship qualification tournament in March. Brunei and Laos also withdrew from the tournament.

Draw 
The top six teams from the 2005 AFF U-22 Championship were seeded in Pot 1, the remaining teams were in Pot 2. Cambodia were assigned to position B1 as hosts.

Notes
Team in bold is the defending champion.
Team in italic is the host.
(P): Did not enter.
(W): Withdrew after draw.

Result

Squads 

A final squad of 23 players (three of whom must be goalkeepers) must be registered one day before the first match of the tournament.

Group stage 
All times are local, ICT (UTC+7).

Group A

Group B

Knockout stage 
In the knockout stage, penalty shoot-outs were used to decide the winner if necessary.

Bracket

Semi-finals

Third place match

Final

Winners

Awards

Goalscorers 
3 goals

  Marinus Wanewar
  Saringkan Promsupa
  Trần Danh Trung

2 goals

  Hadi Fayyadh Razak
  Lê Xuân Tú

1 goal

  Sath Rosib
  Yue Safy
  Sin Sophanat
  Luthfi Kamal
  Osvaldo Haay
  Rachmat Irianto
  Sani Rizki Fauzi
  Witan Sulaeman
  Nik Akif Syahiran Nik Mat
  Myat Kaung Khant
  Jeremiah Borlongan
  Jaroensak Wonggorn
  Jedsadakorn Kowngam
  Mouzinho Barreto de Lima
  Lê Minh Bình
  Phan Thanh Hậu

Final ranking

Broadcasters 
All 16 matches were broadcast live and free to access in Cambodia, some ASEAN countries and internationally via the Football Federation of Cambodia (FFC)'s official Facebook page, although in the Khmer language.

ASEAN

References

External links 
 

2019
2019 in AFF football
2019 in youth association football
International association football competitions hosted by Cambodia